John Halligan (born 18 January 1955) is an Irish former Independent politician who served as a Teachta Dála (TD) for the Waterford constituency from 2011 to 2020. He also served as Minister of State from 2016 to 2020.

He was first elected to the Waterford City Council in 1999, for the Workers' Party. At the 2004 local elections, he topped the poll in Waterford No. 3 electoral area. He was an unsuccessful Workers' Party candidate for the Waterford constituency at the 2002 and 2007 general elections. In February 2008, he resigned from the Workers' Party, when the party refused to drop its opposition to service charges, which Halligan supported. In 2009, as an Independent candidate, Halligan again topped the poll in his area. After the 2009 local elections, Halligan entered into a pact with Fine Gael and the Labour Party on Waterford City Council. As a result, he was duly elected Mayor of Waterford, serving from 2009 to 2010.

He was elected as a TD for the Waterford constituency at the 2011 general election, receiving 5,546 first preference votes (10.3%) and was elected on the 11th count. Following his election to the Dáil in February 2011, Sean Reinhardt was co-opted to replace Halligan on Waterford City Council. In March 2011, Halligan joined the Dáil technical group allowing himself more speaking time in Dáil debates. On 15 December 2011, he helped launch a nationwide campaign against a proposed household charge being brought in as part of the 2012 budget.

He joined the Independent Alliance upon its inception in 2015. On 27 February 2016, he was re-elected as a TD for Waterford at the general election, receiving 8,306 first preference votes and was elected on the 8th count. After prolonged talks on government formation, the Independent Alliance supported the nomination of Enda Kenny as Taoiseach on 6 May 2016, allowing Kenny to become the first Leader of Fine Gael to be re-elected to the office of Taoiseach.

On 19 May 2016, Halligan was appointed by the new government a Minister of State at the Department of Education and Skills and at the Department of Jobs, Enterprise and Innovation with responsibility for Training and Skills. On 20 June 2017, after Leo Varadkar succeeded Kenny as Taoiseach, Halligan was appointed by the government as Minister of State at the Department of Education and Skills and at the Department of Business, Enterprise and Innovation with responsibility for Training, Skills, Innovation, Research and Development.

In November 2017, the Workplace Relations Commission found that he had violated equality legislation by asking a candidate "Do you have children? How old are your children?" during a job interview; the WRC ordered the minister's department to pay €7,500 to the candidate.

He retired from the Dáil at the 2020 general election on 8 May, continuing in office as a junior minister until the formation of a new government on 27 June 2020.

References

1955 births
Living people
Independent TDs
Local councillors in County Waterford
Mayors of Waterford
Members of the 31st Dáil
Members of the 32nd Dáil
Ministers of State of the 32nd Dáil
Workers' Party (Ireland) politicians
Alumni of Waterford Institute of Technology